Francesco Morone (1471 – 16 May 1529) was an Italian painter, active in his native city of Verona in a Renaissance style. He was the son of the Veronese painter Domenico Morone. The art biographer Vasari praised his frescoes (1505-7) for the cupola of the sacristy in Santa Maria in Organo, Verona. He also painted the organ shutters in that church. Paolo Cavazzola was said to have been a pupil, but may have more aptly worked with one of his family members.

Works
Virgin and Child, Pinacoteca di Brera, Milan
Virgin and Child, National Gallery, London
Samson and Delilah, Museo Poldi Pezzoli, Milan
Frescos at Santa Chiara Church, Verona

References

C. Del Bravo : Sul seguito veronese di A. Mantegna e Francesco Morone in "Paragone" (1962)

External links

 Samson and Delilah in Museo Poldi-Pezzoli

1471 births
1529 deaths
15th-century Italian painters
Italian male painters
16th-century Italian painters
Italian Renaissance painters
Painters from Verona